The Lézarde is a river of Martinique. It flows into the Caribbean Sea near Le Lamentin.

See also
List of rivers of Martinique

References
NOAA map

Rivers of Martinique
Rivers of France